The Nakba, also known as the Palestinian Catastrophe, was the destruction of Palestinian society and homeland in 1948, and the permanent displacement of a majority of the Palestinian Arabs. The term is used to describe both the events of 1948 and the ongoing persecution, displacement, and occupation of the Palestinians, both in the occupied West Bank and the Gaza Strip, as well as in Palestinian refugee camps throughout the region.

The foundational events of the Nakba took place during and shortly after the 1948 Palestine war, including 78% of Mandatory Palestine being declared as Israel, the exodus of 700,000 Palestinians, the related depopulation and destruction of over 500 Palestinian villages and subsequent geographical erasure, the denial of the Palestinian right of return, the creation of permanent Palestinian refugees and the "shattering of Palestinian society".

In 1998, Yasser Arafat proposed that Palestinians should mark the 50th anniversary of the Nakba declaring 15 May, the day after Israeli independence in 1948, as Nakba Day, formalizing a date that had been unofficially used as early as 1949.

The Nakba greatly influenced the Palestinian culture and is a foundational symbol of Palestinian identity, together with "Handala", the keffiyeh and the symbolic key. Countless books, songs and poems have been written about the Nakba. Palestinian poet Mahmoud Darwish described the Nakba as "an extended present that promises to continue in the future."

Components 
The Nakba encompasses the displacement, dispossession, statelessness and fracturing of Palestinian society.

Displacement 

During the 1947–49 Palestine war, an estimated 700,000 Palestinians fled or were expelled, comprising around 80% of the Palestinian Arab inhabitants of what became Israel. Almost half of this figure (approximately 250,000–300,000 Palestinians) had fled or had been expelled ahead of the Israeli Declaration of Independence in May 1948, a fact which was named as a casus belli for the entry of the Arab League into the country, sparking the 1948 Arab–Israeli War. In the period after the war, a large number of Palestinians attempted to return to their homes; between 2,700 and 5,000 Palestinians were killed by Israel during this period, the vast majority being unarmed and intending to return for economic or social reasons.

At the same time, a significant proportion of those Palestinians who remained in Israel became internally displaced. In 1950, UNRWA estimated that 46,000 of the 156,000 Palestinians who remained inside the borders demarcated as Israel by the 1949 Armistice Agreements were internally displaced refugees. Today some 274,000 Arab citizens of Israel – or one in four in Israel – are internally displaced from the events of 1948.

Dispossession and erasure 

The UN Partition Plan of 1947 assigned 56% of Palestine to the future Jewish state, while the Palestinian majority, 66%, were to receive 44% of the territory. 80% of the land in the programmed Jewish state was already owned by Palestinians, 11% had Jewish title. Before, during and after the 1947–49 war, hundreds of Palestinian towns and villages were depopulated and destroyed. Geographic names throughout the country were erased and replaced with Hebrew names, sometimes derivatives of the historical Palestinian nomenclature, and sometimes new inventions. Numerous non-Jewish historical sites were destroyed, not just during the wars, but in a subsequent process over a number of decades. For example, over 80% of Palestinian village mosques have been destroyed, and artefacts have been removed from museums and archives.

A variety of laws were promulgated in Israel to legalize the expropriation of Palestinian land.

Statelessness and denationalization 
The creation of Palestinian statelessness is a central component of the Nakba and continues to be a feature of Palestinian national life to the present day. All Arab Palestinians became immediately stateless as a result of the Nakba, although some took on other nationalities. After 1948, Palestinians ceased to be simply Palestinian, instead becoming either Israeli-Palestinians, UNRWA Palestinians, West Bank-Palestinians, and Gazan-Palestinians, in addition to the wider Palestinian diaspora who were able to achieve residency outside of historic Palestine and the refugee camps.

The first Israeli Nationality Law, passed on 14 July 1952, denationalized Palestinians, rendering the former Palestinian citizenship "devoid of substance", "not satisfactory and is inappropriate to the situation following the establishment of Israel".

Fracturing of society 

The Nakba was the primary cause of the Palestinian diaspora; at the same time Israel was created as a Jewish homeland, the Palestinians were turned into a "refugee nation" with a "wandering identity". Today a majority of the 13.7 million Palestinians live in the diaspora, i.e. they live outside of the historical area of Mandatory Palestine, primarily in other countries of the Arab world. Of the 6.2 million people registered by the UN's dedicated Palestinian refugee agency, UNRWA, about 40% live in the West Bank and Gaza, and 60% in the diaspora. A large number of these diaspora refugees are not integrated into their host countries, as illustrated by the ongoing tension of Palestinians in Lebanon or the 1990–91 Palestinian exodus from Kuwait.

These factors have resulted in a Palestinian identity of "suffering", whilst the deterritorialization of the Palestinians has created a uniting factor and focal point in the desire to return to their lost homeland.

Terminology 

The term Nakba was first applied to the events of 1948 by Constantin Zureiq, a professor of history at the American University of Beirut, in his 1948 book Macnā an-Nakba (The Meaning of the Disaster). Zureiq wrote that "the tragic aspect of the Nakba is related to the fact that it is not a regular misfortune or a temporal evil, but a Disaster in the very essence of the word, one of the most difficult that Arabs have ever known over their long history." Prior to 1948, the "Year of the Catastrophe" among Arabs referred to 1920, when European colonial powers partitioned the Ottoman Empire into a series of separate states along lines of their own choosing.

The word was used again one year later by the Palestinian poet Burhan al-Deen al-Abushi. Zureiq's students subsequently founded the Arab Nationalist Movement in 1952, one of the first post-Nakba Palestinian political movements. In a six-volume encyclopedia Al-Nakba: Nakbat Bayt al-Maqdis Wal-Firdaws al-Mafqud (The Catastrophe: The Catastrophe of Jerusalem and the Lost Paradise) published between 1958–60, Aref al-Aref wrote: "How Can I call it but Nakba? When we the Arab people generally and the Palestinians particularly, faced such a disaster (Nakba) that we never faced like it along the centuries, our homeland was sealed, we [were] expelled from our country, and we lost many of our beloved sons." Muhammad Nimr al-Hawari also used the term Nakba in the title of his book Sir al Nakba (The Secret behind the Disaster) written in 1955. The use of the term has evolved over time.

Initially, the use of the term Nakba among Palestinians was not universal. For example, many years after 1948, Palestinian refugees in Lebanon avoided and even actively resisted using the term, because it lent permanency to a situation they viewed as temporary, and they often insisted on being called "returnees". In the 1950s and 1960s, terms they used to describe the events of 1948 included al-'ightiṣāb ("the rape"), or were more euphemistic, such as al-'aḥdāth ("the events"), al-hijra ("the exodus"), and lammā sharnā wa-tla'nā ("when we blackened our faces and left"). Nakba narratives were avoided by the leadership of the Palestine Liberation Organization (PLO) in Lebanon in the 1970s, in favor of a narrative of revolution and renewal. Interest in the Nakba by organizations representing refugees in Lebanon surged in the 1990s due to the perception that the refugees' right of return might be negotiated away in exchange for Palestinian statehood, and the desire was to send a clear message to the international community that this right was non-negotiable.

Since the late 1990s, the phrase “ongoing Nakba” has emerged to describe the "continuous experience of violence and dispossession" experienced by the Palestinian people. This term enjoins the understanding of the Nakba not as an event in 1948, but as an ongoing process that continues through to the present day.

Israeli perspectives

Israeli narrative 
The period of the Nakba is the "other side of the coin" of the period which many Jewish Israelis refer to as the birth of the state of Israel and their "War of Independence". Jewish Israelis commonly perceive the 1948 war and its outcome as an equally formative and fundamental event – as an act of justice and redemption for the Jewish people after centuries of historical suffering, and the key step in the "negation of the Diaspora". As a result, the narrative is extremely sensitive to the Israeli identity. As one paper on the subject puts it: "Silence on the Nakba is also part of everyday life in Israel."

State funding penalties for Nakba commemoration 
In May 2009, Yisrael Beiteinu introduced a bill that would outlaw all Nakba commemorations, with a three-year prison sentence for such acts of remembrance. Following public criticism, the bill draft was changed, the prison sentence dropped and instead the Minister of Finance would have the authority to reduce state funding for Israeli institutions found to be "commemorating Independence Day or the day of the establishment of the state as a day of mourning". The new draft was approved by the Knesset in March 2011. The implementation of the new law unintentionally promoted knowledge of the Nakba within Israeli society, an example of the Streisand effect.

In films and literature 
Farha, a film about the Nakba directed by Jordanian director Darin Sallam, was chosen as Jordan’s official submission for the 2023 Academy Awards International Feature Film category. In response,  Avigdor Lieberman, the Israeli Finance Minister, ordered the treasury to withdraw government funding for Jaffa’s Al Saraya Theater where the film is scheduled for projection.

Long-term implications 
The most important long-term implications of the Nakba for the Palestinian people were the loss of their homeland, the fragmentation and marginalization of their national community, and their transformation into a stateless people.

See also 
 Haifa Declaration
 Jewish exodus from the Muslim world
 Farha (film)

References

Notes

Citations

Sources 

 
 
 
 
 
 
 
 
 
 
 
 
 
 
 
 
 
 
 
 
 
 
 

1940s neologisms
Arabic words and phrases
History of Palestine (region)
Society of the State of Palestine
Statelessness
History of the Palestinian refugees
National symbols of the State of Palestine
Anti-Palestinian sentiment
1948 Palestinian exodus
Ethnic cleansing in Asia